Patrick J. LeSage  is the former Chief Justice of the Ontario Superior Court of Justice.

Career

Judicial career 
He received his legal education at Osgoode Hall Law School in 1961.

In 1975, LeSage was appointed to Ontario's County and District Court, and In 1983 he was named Associate Chief Judge of that court.

In 1990, the County and District Court was merged into the Ontario Court (General Division). LeSage became Associate Chief Justice of that court in 1994 and Chief Justice in 1996. After the court system was reorganized in 1999, LeSage was Chief Justice of the Ontario Superior Court of Justice before retiring in 2002.

In 1995, LeSage presided over the trial of Paul Bernardo in connection with the kidnapping, torture, and murders of Kristen French and Leslie Mahaffy in St. Catharines, Ontario. LeSage has said this was the case that affected him most profoundly in his career.

Post-Retirement 
After retiring from the bench, LeSage practiced as Counsel at the law firm Gowlings, in Toronto. He has since retired from the firm.

Since 2004, LeSage has sat on the Board of Governors of York University. In 2005 he was elected a senior fellow of Massey College. He was also appointed a commissioner of the Ontario Securities Commission.

The Government of Ontario appointed LeSage to conduct a review of the province's police complaints system; he presented his report on this matter in 2005.

The Attorney General of Manitoba appointed LeSage to conduct an inquiry into the wrongful conviction of James Driskell for murder.

Awards and recognition 
In December 2007 LeSage was appointed a Member of the Order of Canada for his contributions to the Ontario judiciary, notably as Chief Justice of the Superior Court of Ontario, and for his ongoing dedication to public service. In 2009, he was made a member of the Order of Ontario.

LeSage holds honorary degrees from the University of Windsor (1996), Laurentian University (2001), and the Law Society of Upper Canada (2006).

Personal 
Justice LeSage was born and raised in Tweed, Ontario. Third of four children, his father was of French Canadian ancestry. “I played hockey, but not very well. I played football with Jack Vance, but again, not well.” Following graduation from high school in Tweed and receiving a Bachelor of Commerce degree from the University of Ottawa, he returned to Tweed to work in the family fuel business for a year and a half before studying law at Osgoode Hall. LeSage remarked, “I've presided in every county or district courthouse in Ontario.” 
LeSage is married to Susan Lang, who sits on the Court of Appeal for Ontario.

References

External links
official page at Gowlings.com
 Patrick LeSage Begins New Life in Law

Living people
Members of the Order of Canada
Members of the Order of Ontario
Judges in Ontario
Lawyers in Ontario
Massey College, Toronto
Year of birth missing (living people)